Dr Asiata Alaelua Va'alepa Sale'imoa Va'ai (25 May 1945 – 2 September 2010) was a Samoan politician and lawyer.  He was Member of Parliament for the territorial constituency of Satupa'itea and the leader of the Samoan United Independents Political Party and Samoan Democratic United Party.

Asiata was the son of former Prime Minister Va'ai Kolone and the brother of Tautua Samoa MP Va'ai Papu Vailupe. He worked as a barrister in Samoa and New Zealand, before working for the Pacific Islands Forum secretariat in Suva, Fiji.  Later he served as president of the Samoa Law Society from 1985 to 1987 and of the Inter-Pacific Bar Association from 1998 to 2001.

Va'ai was elected to Parliament at the 2001 election, representing the constituency of Satupa'itea. He was re-elected in 2006, and became leader of the SDUP in August of that year. As a result, the party fragmented, and ceased to be recognised by the Samoan Parliament.

References

External links
 Profile at the Samoan Fono.

1945 births
2010 deaths
Members of the Legislative Assembly of Samoa
Samoan lawyers
Samoan chiefs
Samoan United Independents Political Party politicians
People from Satupa'itea